The Qit'a (lit. "fragment" or "piece") is a form of monorhyme poetry that usually appears in Arabic, Persian, Turkish, Urdu and other associated literature.

References

Sources 
 

Arabic literature
Persian poetry
Turkish poetry
Urdu-language literature